Justin Hunt may refer to:

 Justin Hunt (filmmaker), American documentary filmmaker
 Justin Hunt (rugby league), Australian footballer